Devin Mullins (born 4 October 1985 in Bahamas) is a professional tennis player.

Mullins represents the Bahamas and has appeared in 17 Davis Cup ties for his country since 2002. He has an ATP tour win–loss record of 6–8 primarily through his Davis Cup exploits.  He has played one main draw "Challenger" singles event, in Quito, Ecuador in 2007, where he reached the second round.

Mullins has competed in several "Futures" events. He reached a career-high ranking of World No. 886 in August 2007.

Career

2008 Beijing Olympics
Mullings appeared in the men's singles tournament at the 2008 Beijing Olympics in August 2008 as an alternate. He lost to the number 52 ranked Agustín Calleri from Argentina 6–1, 6–1 in the opening round.

References

External links

1985 births
Living people
Bahamian male tennis players
Olympic tennis players of the Bahamas
People from Freeport, Bahamas
Tennis players at the 2008 Summer Olympics
Tennis players at the 2007 Pan American Games
Pan American Games competitors for the Bahamas
Tennis players at the 2010 Commonwealth Games
Central American and Caribbean Games bronze medalists for the Bahamas
Competitors at the 2010 Central American and Caribbean Games
Central American and Caribbean Games medalists in tennis
Commonwealth Games competitors for the Bahamas